is a dam in Agano, Niigata, Japan, completed in 1929.

References 

Dams in Niigata Prefecture
Dams completed in 1929